Esther Uzodinma is a Nigerian actress and producer best known for her role as "Angela" in the Africa Magic TV series My Siblings and I.

Early life and career
She is studying Mass Communication at the University of Lagos.
In 2018, Esther started her acting career in the Africa Magic drama TV series, My Siblings and I, which was released in January 2018.
Esther starred as character "Sade" in the television series Sade (The Missing Girl). She complains about not having attention from men.

Selected filmography
Cornerstones (2017)
Cursed Egg (2017)
Witch Empire (2017)
Dance Hustlers (2018)
Secrets (2019)
Papa Betty (2021)
Ije Awele (2022)

Television
Papa Ajasco (2018)
 My Siblings and I  (2018)
 Sade (The Missing Girl)  (2020)

References

External links
 Esther Uzodinma on IMDb
 Esther Uzodinma Flixcatalog

Living people
Residents of Lagos
Year of birth missing (living people)
Nigerian film actresses
University of Lagos alumni
21st-century Nigerian actresses
Nigerian television actresses
Nigerian film producers
Igbo actresses
Nigerian women film producers